Ludwig Rosenthal (2 July 1840, Fellheim, Bavaria - 23 December 1928, Munich) was a German antiquarian bookseller. His father, Joseph Rosenthal, was a lover of old books and odd bric-a-brac. Rosenthal apprenticed in Ellwangen, Baden-Württemberg before opening his business in Fellheim. In 1868, he moved to Munich and established himself at 16 Hildegardstrasse, almost immediately behind the Bavarian National Museum.

Biography

Rosenthal was the eldest son of the market trader Joseph Rosenthal, who ran an art and antiques shop in Fellheim. His mother Dorlene, née Bacharach, was born into a Jewish family of butchers from Fellheim. Rosenthal's three siblings were Jette, Nathan and Jacob, who later, changed his name to Jacques. He grew up in the town's Jewish community and attended the Jewish-Christian school. At the age of thirteen, he transferred to the Buxheim Charterhouse. After training as a bookseller with Isaak Hess in Ellwangen, Rosenthal opened his own art and antiques trade in 1859 in Fellheim.

In 1867, the Rosenthal family moved to Munich where Rosenthal and his brother Jacob (Jacques) founded "Rosenthal Antiquarian". In the holdings, there was a map of the circumnavigation of Magellan from the year 1523. Rosenthal acquired books from various libraries, including the library of St. Vitus' Abbey on the Rott, the city library of Leutkirch im Allgäu, the library of the family Hoermann of Gutenberg, the library of the Jesuit College at Landsberg am Lech, the library of Karl Maria von Aretin, parts of the library of Buxheim Charterhouse, and the library of the Lobris manor in Silesia. Around the turn of the century, Rosenthal's Antiquariat contained more than a million books, and was larger than the Bavarian State Library. In 1905, he appointed his three sons Adolf, Heinrich and Norbert Rosenthal as his partners. Rosenthal died in 1928. During the Nazi period, part of family was able to migrate to the United States. Sons and daughters of the Rosenthal family operate the family's antique book and music business in the Netherlands (which specializes in Incunabula, early printed books, Hebraica, Humanism, illustrated books, and prints), the United Kingdom, and in the United States.

References
Notes

Citations

Bibliography
 Arbeitskreis Geschichte, Brauchtum und Chronik in "Zusammenarbeit mit dem Amt für ländliche Entwicklung und der Gemeinde Fellheim": Fellheim an der Iller. Eine bebilderte Führung durch den ehemaligen jüdischen Ortskern Fellheims, 2007. (in German)
 Sigrid Krämer (2005), "Rosenthal, Ludwig", Neue Deutsche Biographie (NDB) (Berlin: Duncker & Humblo) 22: 76–77. (in German)
 Gabriella Rosenthal (editor): Der Holocaust im Leben von drei Generationen. Psychosozial-Verlag, 461 Seiten, 1997, . (in German)
 Stadtarchiv München (editor): Die Rosenthals. Der Aufstieg einer jüdischen Antiquarsfamilie zu Weltruhm. Mit Beiträgen von Elisabeth Angermair, Jens Koch, Anton Löffelmeier, Eva Ohlen und Ingo Schwab, Wien u.a. Böhlau. 2002, . (in German)
 Bernard M. Rosenthal: "Cartel, Clan, or Dynastiy? The Olschkis and the Rosenthals 1859–1976". Harvard Library Bulletin, Volume XXV, Number 4, October 1977.

External links
 
 Official website of Ludwig Rosenthal's Antiquariaat, the Netherlands

1840 births
1928 deaths
Writers from Unterallgäu
German booksellers
German antiquarians
19th-century German Jews
Antiquarian booksellers
German male non-fiction writers